Banat is a city in Shamli district in the state of Uttar Pradesh, India. Banat is situated very near to Shamli City.

Geography
It has an average elevation of 254 metres (797 feet).

Demographics 
As of the 2011 Census of India, Banat had a population of 7458. Males constitute 53% of the population and females 47%. Banat has an average literacy rate of 87%, higher than the national average of 74%; with 88% of the males and 85% of females literate. 11% of the population is under 6 years of age.

References 

Cities and towns in Shamli district